John Dennison 'Dinny' Campbell (22 July 1889 – 30 August 1966) was a national representative for Australia in rugby union before switching codes and playing rugby league for the Eastern Suburbs club during the 1910–12 and 1921 seasons.

Rugby & Rugby league career
Campbell was born in Penrith, New South Wales. He played in the centre position in rugby union, claiming a total of 3 international rugby caps for Australia.

He switched to the professional code of rugby league football, playing for Eastern Suburbs. Campbell played alongside Dally Messenger in Easts first premiership winning sides. He was also a representative of New South Wales (NSW) in matches against Queensland, and New Zealand in the 1911 and '12 seasons. He returned and played one last season with Easts in 1921.

English career
At the end of the 1912 season he moved to England, where he enjoyed 9 very successful seasons - scoring 136 tries. In 1921 Campbell returned to Australia, where he linked with his former club, Eastern Suburbs, for one final season. Campbell later went on to become a talent scout for the Eastern suburbs. Campbell made his début for Leeds against Keighley at Headingley Rugby Stadium, Leeds on Saturday 14 September 1912. Campbell played left-, i.e. number 4, in Leeds' 2–35 defeat by Huddersfield in the Championship Final during the 1914–15 season.

References

Further reading

 The Encyclopedia of Rugby League Players; Alan Whiticker & Glen Hudson

External links
(archived by web.archive.org) Profile at leedsrugby.dnsupdate.co.uk

1889 births
1966 deaths
Australia international rugby union players
Australian rugby league players
Australian rugby union players
Leeds Rhinos players
Sydney Roosters players
North Sydney Bears players
Rugby union players from Sydney
Rugby union centres